Neil Watson (born February 2, 1991) is a former American professional basketball player for the Plymouth Raiders of the British Basketball League and is currently an assistant coach for Park University. He competed in college basketball for the University of Southern Mississippi.

Early life and education
Watson was born on February 2, 1991, in Kansas City, Kansas. He attended college at Coffeyville Community College and the University of Southern Mississippi.

Career
Out of high school, Watson tried out for the Toledo men's basketball team but was rejected. He transferred to the University of Southern Mississippi under coach Larry Eustachy. Watson's first season with the Golden Eagles resulted in an NCAA Tournament berth along with other starters Maurice Bolden (Sr.) Angelo Johnson (Sr.) Dwayne Davis (Jr.) and Johnathan Mills (Jr.). The Golden Eagles finished 25–9, losing in the first round to the Kansas State Wildcats in the NCAA Tournament.

In Watson's junior season, he carried the Golden Eagles with 9 points, 5 assists, and 2 steals per game. The Golden Eagles lost the Conference USA championship to the Memphis Tigers in double overtime. Watson led the Golden Eagles to the NIT quarterfinal, which they lost to the BYU Cougars. Watson had his best season in his senior year and led the Golden Eagles, averaging 11 points, 5 assists, and 2 steals per game. He was also fourth in the nation in free-throw percentage with 92%. The Golden Eagles made another NIT tournament but lost to the Minnesota Golden Gophers in the quarterfinals. After the loss, Watson was named a starter in the Reese's NCAA Basketball All-Star game.

Watson was not drafted or signed by any NBA or development league roster but was named on the U.K.'s oldest professional basketball team, the Leicester Riders. He departed Leicester Riders at the end of the 2015–16 season eventually joining Glasgow Rocks also in the British Basketball League (BBL). 

At the start of the 2017 Season Neil Watson joined the Plymouth Raiders and was brought in following his success and experience within the British Basketball League (BBL). 

In 2019 Neil founded TeeaTime basketball to provide training and coaching to youth players in Kansas City who are willing to put in the Time, Energy, Effort and Attitude required to grow as players and people.

References

External links
Southern Miss bio
http://www.sports-reference.com/cbb/players/neil-watson-1.html http://www.southernmiss.com/sports/m-baskbl/sched/smis-m-baskbl-sched.html

1991 births
Living people
American expatriate basketball people in the United Kingdom
American men's basketball players
Basketball players from Kansas City, Missouri
Coffeyville Red Ravens men's basketball players
Glasgow Rocks players
Leicester Riders players
Plymouth Raiders players
Point guards
Southern Miss Golden Eagles basketball players